The 2si 808 is a family of in-line three cylinder, liquid-cooled, two-stroke, dual ignition, aircraft engines that were designed for ultralight aircraft.

The basic engine was originally designed and produced by JLO-Motorenwerke of Germany and was later acquired by the AMW Cuyuna Engine Company of Beaufort, South Carolina and marketed under the Cuyuna brand name. Later the engine was marketed by Cuyuna under the Two Stroke International (2si) brand. Cuyuna no longer markets engines for aircraft use and the 808 is out of production.

Development
The 808 is a conventional three-cylinder engine that weighs  in its L95 and L100 aircraft versions. The engine features dual capacitor discharge ignition, liquid cooling, fuel pump, a cast iron cylinder liner, ball, needle and roller bearings throughout. The aircraft version was offered with an optional gearbox reduction system. Starting is electric starter only.

Variants
808 L95
Gasoline aircraft engine with three carburetors,  at 7000 rpm, weight , out of production.
808 L100
Gasoline aircraft engine with three carburetors,  at 7000 rpm, weight , out of production.

Applications
Bede BD-5
Reflex Lightning Bug
Rowley P-40F

Specifications (808 L100 aircraft engine)

See also

References

Two-stroke aircraft piston engines
Straight-three engines